Bow Wow are a Japanese rock band formed in 1975. Originally consisting of guitarist and vocalists Kyoji Yamamoto and Mitsuhiro Saito, bassist Kenji Sano and drummer Toshihiro Niimi, they were one of the first Japanese metal bands. After releasing nine studio albums, Saito left in 1983. The band then adopted a mainstream sound by recruiting lead vocalist Genki Hitomi and keyboardist Rei Atsumi and renamed themselves to Vow Wow. They relocated to England in 1986, before Sano left the band the following year and Yamamoto invited former Whitesnake bassist Neil Murray to replace him. After Murray left to join Black Sabbath, studio bassist Mark Gould played on Vow Wow's last album before they disbanded in 1990.

Yamamoto reformed Bow Wow in 1995 with all new members, before it became a trio when fellow original members Saito and Niimi rejoined in 1998. Niimi left in 2015 and the group now performs under the name Bow Wow G2, which refers to the two guitarists being the only official members.

Tomoaki Hokari of OK Music wrote that Bow Wow was one of the first Japanese bands to prove that domestic musicians could compete with Western hard rock acts. In Japan their best-selling album is V which reached number 12 on the Oricon chart. Internationally their best-selling album is Helter Skelter, which reached number 75 on the UK Albums Chart.

History

1975–1983: Bow Wow
Bow Wow was formed in 1975 by Yoshimi Ueno, a record producer who was looking to create an idol-like band such as The Monkees or the Bay City Rollers. After recruiting vocalist and guitarist Mitsuhiro Saito and drummer Toshihiro Niimi, whom he had managed before, vocalist and guitarist Kyoji Yamamoto and bassist Kenji Sano were scouted from Yamaha Music School and Bow Wow was officially formed. Hokari wrote that, once 19-year-old guitar virtuoso Yamamoto joined and was elected to sing in English, the idol concept was largely dropped in favor of authenticity.

They were quickly signed to Victor and used the money to buy a truck that could double as a stage, which earned them interviews with many magazines and television shows. Bow Wow released their self-titled debut album in 1976. Yamamoto recalled that when he joined, he told the producer he was a guitarist and not a singer, but during recording someone suggested he sing in English and he went with it. In 1977, they opened for Aerosmith and Kiss on their Japanese tours and released two more albums, Signal Fire and Charge. The title track from Signal Fire was named the 28th best guitar instrumental by Young Guitar Magazine in 2019.

According to AllMusic's Eduardo Rivadavia, their next few records were criticized by critics and fans as being musically all over the place, veering from their hard rock roots, and suffering from poor production values. Yamamoto himself has described the three consecutive albums, Guarantee (1978), Glorious Road and Telephone (both 1980), as being the band's "pop era." He noted that Saito was the main vocalist on the first two, but he took over vocal duties again on Telephone, where he looked to fuse pop with rock. For Telephone the band switched record labels to Sounds Marketing System and worked with producer Touru Yazawa, who had produced the folk rock group Alice.

Bow Wow followed up with Hard Dog in 1981, which returned the band to a respectable hard rock act. In 1982, they switched labels again to VAP and released both Asian Volcano and Warning from Stardust. Writing for Rolling Stone Japan, Daisuke Kawasaki rated Warning from Stardust at No. 23 on a 2007 list of the "100 Greatest Japanese Rock Albums of All Time". The band also performed at that year's Montreux Jazz Festival in Switzerland and the Reading Festival in England. The following year they toured with Hanoi Rocks across the UK and performed their final concert at Nakano Sun Plaza on November 21, 1983. Which was the last with Saito, who left to join ARB.

1984–1990: Vow Wow
In 1984, the remaining three members were joined by vocalist Genki Hitomi and keyboardist Rei Atsumi, this resulted in a more commercial sound and the band decided a name change was necessary. Now called Vow Wow, the group produced Beat of Metal Motion (1984) before signing to Toshiba EMI for Cyclone (1985) and relocating to England in 1986. After releasing the album III that year, they found themselves without a bassist when Kenji Sano returned to Japan in May 1987. Former Whitesnake bass player Neil Murray was recruited to fill the spot after he and Yamamoto worked on the second album from Phenomena, although Murray later stated he never became a full member. They then began recording the album V (1987) with producer Kit Woolven (Thin Lizzy, David Bowie) and co-producer John Wetton, who wrote the lyrics for the album's hit single "Don't Leave Me Now". They were asked by Tommy Vance to create the jingles for his British radio program, the Friday Rock Show. After releasing Vibe (1988), which included the hard rock anthem "Rock Me Now", the band returned to Japan for a national tour. Although experiencing commercial success, Hitomi wanted to remain in Japan to begin a family. Vow Wow recorded what was to be their final album, Helter Skelter (1989), which was handled by Tony Taverner (Gipsy Kings, Black Sabbath) and was, as Rivadavia put it, a "re-sequenced, repackaged, and reissue" of Vibe. After the album, Atsumi joined RC Succession for a live tour and Murray became a member of Black Sabbath.

Shortly after, producers Nick Griffiths (Queen, Paul McCartney) and Bob Ezrin (Kiss, Pink Floyd) requested to create an album with Vow Wow. The band regrouped in Los Angeles without Murray, and utilized American studio bassist Mark Gould for their final album, Mountain Top. Vow Wow disbanded after a May 28, 1990 concert at the Nippon Budokan. Yamamoto later said that the band had thought they could get signed to an American record label, but when that did not happen, "We lost our aim and then we started to get frustrated and our relationships collapsed. It was sad but 1990 was a bad year for hard rock bands. The hard rock and heavy metal scene was in decline." Hitomi became a high school English teacher, while the other members each continued separate musical careers, Yamamoto forming the band Wild Flag in 1991.

1995–present: Bow Wow revival and Vow Wow reunion concerts
In May 1995, Yamamoto reformed Bow Wow with all new members. They had several releases until dissolving in March 1997. However, Bow Wow became a trio in 1998 when original members Mitsuhiro Saito and Toshihiro Niimi rejoined Yamamoto and they released the album Back. It was followed by Beyond (2000), Another Place (2001) and What's Going On? (2002). In August 2003 they performed in Daegu, South Korea at the O.K.! Crazy!! World Rock Festival. Bow Wow released Era, their most recent album to date, in 2005.

Genki Hitomi and Rei Atsumi reunited with Yamamoto and Niimi for a Vow Wow reunion concert on December 25, 2009, and for two sold-out shows the following year on December 25 and 26, 2010. Bow Wow released the single "King or Queen" in 2014. Niimi left Bow Wow in 2015 and the group now performs sporadically under the name Bow Wow G2, which refers to the two guitarists, Yamamoto and Saito, being the only official members. In August 2016, Bow Wow G2 held a concert for the band's 40th anniversary, which was later released on home video. Three years after their last performance in 2018, the duo held a concert for their 45th anniversary on September 26, 2021 at Ebisu Garden Hall, where they recreated the setlist of Bow Wow's 1978 live album Super Live.

Members

Bow Wow

Current members 
  – lead vocals (1975–1983, 1998–present), guitar (1975–1983, 1995–1997, 1998–present)
  – guitar, vocals (1975–1983, 1998–present)
  – bass (2016–present, support member)
  – drums (2016–present, support member)

Former members 
  – bass (1975–1983)
  – lead vocals (1995–1997)
  – guitar (1995–1997)
  – bass (1995–1997)
  – drums (1995–1996)
  – drums (1975–1983, 1996–1997, 1998–2015)
 Daisuke Kitsuwa – bass (1998–2015, support member)

Vow Wow

Last line-up 
  – lead vocals (1984–1990, 2009, 2010)
 Kyoji Yamamoto – guitar, backing vocals (1984–1990, 2009, 2010)
 Toshihiro Niimi – drums (1984–1990, 2009, 2010)
  – keyboards, synthesizers, piano, keytar, backing vocals  (1984–1990, 2009, 2010)

Former members 
 Kenji Sano – bass, backing vocals (1984–1987)
 Neil Murray – bass, backing vocals (1987–1990)
 Mark Gould – bass, backing vocals (1990)

Timeline

Discography as Bow Wow

Albums

Singles 
 "Volume On" (1976)
 "Still" (1977)
 "Sabishii Yuugi (1978)
 "Hoshii no wa Omae Dake" (1979)
 "Wasurekaketeta Love Song " (1980)
 "Rainy Train" (1980)
 "Keep on Rockin'" (1980)
 "Soldier in the Space" (1980)
 "Gonna be Alright" (1981)
 "Take Me Away" (1982)
 "Forever" (1983)
 "You're Mine" (1983)
 "One Last Time" (2002)
 "King or Queen" (2014)

Compilations 
 The Bow Wow (1979)
 Locus 1976-1983 (1986)
 The Bow Wow II Decennium  (2008)
 XXXV (2011)

Videos 
 The Live Empire (2003)
 Live Explosion 1999 (2003)
 2003.3.22 Live (2003)
 Rock to the Future 2002 Bow Wow vs XYZ→A (2003)
 Super Live 2004 (2005)
 Super Live 2005 (2006)
 Super Live 2006 (2007)
 Super Live 2007 (2008)
 Super Live 2009 (2010)
 Super Live 2011 (2012)
 Bow Wow G2 Live in Tokyo (2017)

Discography as Vow Wow

Albums

Singles

Compilations

Videos 
Every VHS was re-released on DVD on June 14, 2006

References

External links
 Official website
 Official YouTube

Japanese hard rock musical groups
Japanese heavy metal musical groups
Musical groups established in 1975
Musical groups disestablished in 1990
Musical groups reestablished in 1995
Musical groups from Tokyo
English-language musical groups from Japan